Veera Padhakkam is a 1994 Indian Tamil-language film, directed by Manivannan, starring Sathyaraj, Raadhika and Urvashi. It was produced by M.Ramanathan.

Plot
A policeman uses corrupt means to reach the highest position in the police hierarchy. He changes after he meets a relative whose life he had destroyed because of his irresponsible behaviour.

Cast
 Sathyaraj as Kalivarathan
 Raadhika as Thangamma
 Urvashi as Vishalakshi
 Manivannan as Palanisamy 
 Nizhalgal Ravi
 Raghuvaran as Vadivelu
 Silk Smitha
 Sabitha Anand
 Senthil
 R. Sundarrajan
 Vinu Chakravarthy

Music
The music was composed by Deva, with lyrics written by Vaali.

Reception 
Malini Mannath of The Indian Express wrote the film "keeps the viewers engaged in the first half [..] The second half however fails to deliver the same effect." New Straits Times wrote "Those who liked Manivannan's previous political satires will also like this movie".

References

1994 films
1990s Tamil-language films
Indian action films
Films scored by Deva (composer)
Films directed by Manivannan
1994 action films